Karel Mejta may refer to:

 Karel Mejta Sr (1928–2015), Czech rower
 Karel Mejta Jr (born 1951), Czech rower; son of the above